CHLA-FM is a Canadian radio station, which aired at 93.5 FM in Whitehorse, Yukon. Licensed to the Parliamentary Broadcasting Society, a committee of the Yukon Legislative Assembly (YLA), the station airs the Assembly's legislative proceedings, as well as a recorded loop of tourist information when the legislature is not in session.

In 1984, the station was licensed.

Funding issues and closure 
The station's license was revoked by the CRTC in 2003 due to funding issues.

After closure 

The frequency is still/again being used for the indicated purpose is available on the website of the YLA  and also from a news release in June 2015.  This suggests the station may be operating under low-power license-exempt conditions. as allowed under current CRTC regulations.

References

External links

Hla
Legislature broadcasters in Canada
Yukon government departments and agencies
Radio stations disestablished in 2003
Legislature of Yukon
Radio stations established in 1984
1984 establishments in Yukon
2003 disestablishments in Yukon
HLA-FM
HLA-FM